This is a week-by-week listing of the NCAA Division I teams ranked in the 2017 Top 25 coaches poll of the United Soccer Coaches (formerly the National Soccer Coaches Association of America [NSCAA]), the most widely recognized national collegiate soccer ranking system in the U.S. Several weeks prior to the season and each week during the playing season, the 205 Division I teams are voted on by a panel of 24 coaches from the division during a weekly conference call, with the rankings then announced early on Tuesday afternoon (Eastern Time). The poll has no bearing on the selections for the 2017 NCAA Division I Men's Soccer Championship, and the coaches association states: "The NSCAA College Rankings are an indicator of week-to-week status of qualified programs and in no way should be used as a guide or indicator of eligibility for championship selection."

First place votes received in parentheses; rv = received votes. Source =

See also
 2017 NCAA Division I men's soccer season
 2017 NCAA Division I Men's Soccer Championship

References 

NCAA
College soccer rankings in the United States
United Soccer Coaches